Medea: Harlan's World (1985) is a 1985 collection of science fiction short stories by different authors, all taking place on the same fictional moon. It was an experiment in collaborative science fictional world-building, featuring contributions by Hal Clement, Frank Herbert, and others.

It was based on a 1975 UCLA seminar called "10 Tuesdays Down a Rabbit Hole", held by Harlan Ellison and other science fiction authors.

Contents
Introduction: Cosmic Hod-Carriers 
Part I: The Specs 
Introduction 
Basic Concepts: Astrophysics, Geology (by Hal Clement) 
Geology, Meteorology, Oceanography, Geography, Nomenclature, Biology (by Poul Anderson) 
Biology, Ecology, Xenology (by Larry Niven) 
Xenology, Sociology, Politics, Theology, Mathematics (by Frederik Pohl) 
Part II: The Concept Seminar
Part III: The Extrapolations, the Questions 
Part IV: Second Thoughts 
Part V: The Stories 
"Farside Station" by Jack Williamson
"Flare Time" by Larry Niven
"With Virgil Oddum at the East Pole" by Harlan Ellison
"Swanilda's Song" by Frederik Pohl 
"Seasoning" by Hal Clement
"Concepts" by Thomas M. Disch
"Songs of a Sentient Flute" by Frank Herbert
"Hunter's Moon" by Poul Anderson 
"The Promise" by Kate Wilhelm
"Why Dolphins Don't Bite" by Theodore Sturgeon
"Waiting for the Earthquake" by Robert Silverberg

References

Fictional moons
1985 books
1985 short stories
Science fiction anthologies
Works edited by Harlan Ellison